Herbert Raymond "Ray" Pillow (born July 4, 1937) is an American country music singer who has also worked as a music publisher and artists and repertoire (A&R) representative. In his career, he has charted 18 times on the Billboard country singles chart, with his highest-peaking song being the number 9 "I'll Take the Dog", a duet with Jean Shepard. After charting for the last time in 1981, Pillow founded Sycamore Records with Larry McFadden, and later worked in the A&R department of Capitol Records.

Today, Pillow continues to perform as a member of the Grand Ole Opry and on popular classic country television programs such as Country's Family Reunion, which airs regularly in the United States on RFD-TV network.

Through his record label, Pillow has released two albums, including Ray Pillow Live and his recent studio effort containing new material, Country Class.

Pillow has been a member of the Grand Ole Opry since 1966.

Discography

Albums

Singles

References

External links
 (not updated since 2010. Jim Glaser is listed as Webmaster; Glaser died in 2019.)

1937 births
Living people
American country singer-songwriters
Grand Ole Opry members
American male singer-songwriters
ABC Records artists
Place of birth missing (living people)
Capitol Records artists
Dot Records artists
MCA Records artists
Singer-songwriters from Virginia
Musicians from Lynchburg, Virginia